The Colombian Air Force (FAC) is the air force of the Republic of Colombia. The Colombian Air Force is one of the three institutions of the Military Forces of Colombia charged, according to the 1991 Constitution, working to exercise and maintain control of Colombia's airspace and to defend its sovereignty, territorial integrity and constitutional order. It is one of the largest air forces in the Americas (after the United States, Brazil and Peru) and has increased its activity due to important roles in the fight against narco-terrorism. Its main force includes 21 IAI Kfirs as defense fighters and 14 Cessna A-37 Dragonfly plus 24 Embraer 314 Super Tucano for counterinsurgency.

The FAC has been used in observation and aerial combat missions since the Colombian-Peruvian war of 1932 and also operated during the Second World War in the islands of San Andrés.

History

Creation 
Military aviation began in Colombia in 1919 with the creation of a military aviation school for the Colombian Army. Previously by Law 15 of 1916 of September 7 two commissions were sent overseas to study new technological advancements in aviation, infantry, cavalry, engineering and trains. Officers pertaining to the Colombian Army were also sent to take a course on flight training on techniques and tactics. The school was then created in Colombia along with the Colombian National Army Aviation as a fifth regiment by Law 126 of 1919 of December 31 authorized by President of Colombia, Marco Fidel Suárez. The unit was officially activated on February 15, 1921 in Flandes, Department of Tolima with the support of a French mission led by Lieutenant Colonel Rene Guichard. The Aviation School initially had 3 Caudron G.3 E-2, 3 Caudron G.4 A-2 and four Nieuport Delage 11 C-1. The school was closed due to financial hardships in 1922.

The School of Military Aviation was reopened on November 8, 1924 in Madrid, Department of Cundinamarca with the support of a Swiss mission headed by Captain Henry Pillichody. The aircraft used for training were 4 Wild WT and 8 Wild X performing the first air review on August 7, 1927. Then on December 28, 1928 the first combat aircraft was shown in Colombia, the Curtiss Falcon O-1.

War with Peru 

On September 1, 1932, Peruvian civilians crossed into Colombian territory and invaded the town of Leticia in the Colombian Amazon claiming that the town was Peruvian territory. The Colombian military aviation only had 11 instructors, four Curtiss-Wright CW-14R Osprey air combat support planes and one Curtiss Falcon O-1. The military aviation then received full financial support from the Congress of Colombia. Colombia bought aircraft from Germany and the United States, while others were activated from the airline operating in Colombia SCADTA (Sociedad Colombo-Alemana de Transporte Aéreo) and their pilots, which included some German citizens, one of these was Major Herbert Boy. The imported aircraft were 4 Junkers F.13, 4 Junkers W 34 and 3 Junkers K 43, 6 Junkers Ju 52, 2 Dornier Merkur II, 4 Dornier Wal, 20 Curtiss Falcon F-8F and 30 Curtiss Hawk II F-11C.

The contingent was then sent to southern Colombia to fight Peruvian forces with the main mission of delivering supplies to the front lines, aerial reconnaissance and air to land attacks. The fleet was divided into three squadrons with Puerto Boy as the main camp site. Support bases were in Caucaya airstrip (Puerto Leguízamo), El Encanto, Puerto Arica, La Pedrera and Tarapacá. The main combat operations started on February 14, 1933 in Tarapacá where the Peruvian garrison was bombed by seven Colombian aircraft and later assaulted by land forces. Later, on March 26, in the village of Guepi eleven Colombian planes and two cannon boats (MC Cartagena y MC Santa Marta) bombarded Peruvian positions and took over the town.

The last military actions of the conflict with Peru were on May 8, 1933 and in which there was an aerial engagement between the two forces. Peruvian planes were attacking the fluvial fleet of Colombia over the Algodón River and were surprised by the Colombian squadron. One of the Peruvian aircraft, a Douglas O-38P was gunned down and taken to Colombian territory. On May 24, 1933 a cease fire was declared after an agreement was reached with the intervention of the League of Nations. The town of Leticia was returned to Colombia. The captured plane was then returned to Peru. As a result of the war, four pilots died in four accidents during non-combat related actions. Among these was one of the German pilots. Four planes were lost in these accidents a Falcon O-1, an Osprey C-14, a Junker F-13 and a Curtiss F-11.

World War II 

The diplomatic breach between Colombia and the Axis countries (Germany, Italy and Japan) was declared on December 18, 1941, when President Eduardo Santos took the decision following the Japanese attack on military bases, naval and U.S. carriers at Pearl Harbor, Hawaii. Thereafter, the Colombian government introduced special measures to limit and counter the Axis military action in areas of national jurisdiction. On June 23, 1942 a German submarine attacked and sank the Colombian schooner Resolute, 50 miles northwest of the island of San Andrés. The same schooner had rescued some Marine officers and 23 British Royal Navy survivors of a capsized ship, 200 miles north of Cartagena just five days before.

Following these events, the government decided to patrol and monitor the Pacific Coast and the Colombian Caribbean coast. The Palanquero Air Base commanders moved one fighter squadron and a Combat Reconnaissance Squadron, consisting of F-8 Falcon aircraft, to Barranquilla. In 1943, the Falcons were relieved of their mission and replaced by the AT-6 Texan. This squadron was active until 1945, when the AT-6 were transferred back to Palanquero Air Base.

Early 1930s to present 
 In 1936 the first combat monoplanes made of aluminum were purchased by the Colombian Air Force; 3 Seversky P-35/2PA Guardsman.
 While the war was ongoing in southern Colombia, the Air Force built bases in the towns of Buenaventura and Cartagena. The base in Buenaventura was dubbed Air Base of the Pacific and covered the area of the Colombian Pacific region by the Pacific Ocean and began operations on January 26, 1933. The main purpose of this base was to protect the Pacific coast from any maritime intervention since there were reports that the Peruvian protected cruiser BAP Almirante Grau was patrolling the area, as well as two submarines. The Buenaventura base closed in 1949 while the base in Cartagena was handed over to the Colombian Navy in 1936 becoming the ARC Bolívar Naval Base, the most important naval base in Colombia.
 Once the conflict with Peru was over the bases in the Amazon basin were dismantled and the troops sent to new bases like Tres Esquinas Air Force Base in the Department of Caqueta, Palanquero Air Force Base in the Department of Cundinamarca and San José del Guaviare in the Department of Guaviare. Meanwhile, the School of Military Aviation was moved to Cali, and leaving in Madrid the Radiotelegraphy and Maintenance Schools.
 During World War II, North American T-6 Texans and Boeing PT-17 Stearmans were received from the US for pilot training. Soon after World War Two, the Aviación Militar became an independent part of the armed forces, and the Colombian Air Force was created.

 During the period of La Violencia, The Air Force had the necessity to expand its radius of action, so in 1947 the aeródromo nacional de Apiay was created, named the 17 of November 1948 Base Aérea de Apiay, today it home of the Comando Aéreo de Combate No. 2. In this period, the Air Force became more involved in counterinsurgency tasks and B-26C Invaders were acquired. Also, in 1954, the jet age began for the Colombian Air Force with the arrival of 6 Silver Star T-33 and six Canadian Sabre Mark IV F-86 in 1956. The F-86 were retired from service 1966, while the T-33 continued to operate until 1972 when 18 Mirage 5 fighters arrived in three different versions. Sixteen F-80 Shooting Stars were also delivered.
 In 1952, Hiller UH-12 helicopters arrived to the country, initially acquired for the Ministerio de Obras Públicas, but later assigned to the Air Force. In consequence, in 1954, the first helicopter base was created in Melgar, Tolima. Nowadays this base is known as Base Aérea “Capitán Luis F. Gómez Niño”, home of the Comando Aéreo de Combate No. 4 and the Joint Helicopter School of the Armed Forces. In 1959, with the inauguration of the El Dorado International Airport, the Base Aérea de Transporte Militar was created, later renamed as Base Aérea “Brigadier General Camilo Daza”, home today of the Comando Aéreo de Transporte Militar (CATAM). In 1962 in order to integrate economically and socially the furthest regions of the country the Servicio Aéreo a Territorios Nacionales Satena was created.
 Around 1960 the military transport element expanded, with the acquisition of the C-130 Hercules, other types incorporated during the sixties were, the UH-1 Huey, T-37 Tweet and T-41 Mescalero.
 In 1977, to increase control in the northern part of the country, the Grupo Aéreo del Norte was created in Malambo, Atlántico, home today of the Comando Aéreo de Combate No. 3. In 1979, the Grupo Aéreo del Caribe (GACAR) was created, to defend the sovereignty of San Andrés and Providencia from the pretensions of Nicaragua. In 1983, the Grupo Aéreo de Oriente was created in Marandúa,  Vichada to exert more control of the airspace in the eastern part of the country.
 Further expansion took place in the eighties with considerable deliveries of the A-37 Dragonfly, which had earned fame over Vietnam. At the end of the decade a batch of Kfir C2 fighters was delivered from Israel and subsequently upgraded to Kfir C7 by the Comando Aéreo de Mantenimiento (CAMAN) in Madrid in the nineties. The Mirages were upgraded to the same standard by CAMAN, with the installation of canards and improved fuel systems. Both types are also equipped for air-to-air refuelling from the FAC's sole Boeing 707 tanker and transport aircraft. The nineties saw the delivery of specialised COIN-aircraft like the OV-10A Bronco and Embraer Tucano trainers, some of the latter are able to carry bombs and unguided rockets. These aircraft operate mainly over the east of the country, where the Los Llanos region has a high level of guerrilla activity. They regularly deploy to Puerto Carreño under the command of the Grupo Aéreo del Oriente formed in 2000. To deal with continuing guerrilla activity, Escuadrones Aerotácticos (tactical squadrons) were formed at the main FAC bases in the late nineties, consisting of several types of helicopters and AC-47 gunships supplied by their respective Grupos.
 Finally in 1990 the Base Aérea de Rionegro, Antioquia is activated, center of operations of the UH-60 Black Hawk, today this base is called Comando Aéreo de Combate No. 5.
 The 1999 'Plan Colombia' emphasizes on technology, rather than on large numbers of new aircraft being procured, although several new UH-60 Black Hawk helicopters entered FAC service in recent years, including a dedicated attack variant developed by the Colombian Air Force in conjunction with Elbit Systems and Sikorsky, the AH-60L Arpía. Other recently acquired types include Schweizer SA2-37A Condors and Cessna 560 Citations equipped with cameras and sensors to monitor guerrilla and narcotic related activities. Technology upgrades are scheduled for the Bronco fleet, the venerable AC-47 gunships and Huey-helicopters.
 The Colombian Air Force monitors the country's airspace and intercepts suspicious flights, occasionally forcing non-compliant aircraft to the ground. A Hawker 800 carrying 1.2 tonnes of cocaine was shot to the sea in 2015.

Organization 

Combat Air Commands (Comando Aéreo de Combate or CACOM):

  Comando Aéreo de Combate No. 1 (CACOM 1) "CT. Captain Germán Olano Moreno Air Base"in Palanquero / Puerto Salgar, Cundinamarca
 Grupo de combate Nº 11
 Escuadrón de Combate 111 Dardos (Kfir C12)
 Escuadrón de Combate Táctico 113 Fantasma (AB212 Rapaz, AC-47T Fantasma, AH-60L Arpía IV)
 Escuadrón de Combate 116 Tango (T-37B, T-37C)
  Comando Aéreo de Combate No. 2 (CACOM 2) "CT. Luis Fernando Gómez Niño"in Apiay / Villavicencio, Meta
 Grupo de Combate Nº 21
  Escuadrón de Combate 211 Grifos (A-29B Supertucano)
  Escuadrón de Combate 212 Tucanos (AT-27 Tucano)
  Escuadrón de Combate Táctico 213 (AH-60L Arpía IV, C212-300, C208-675, SA2-37B Vampiro, SR-560)
 Grupo de Combate Nº 22 located in Yopal, Casanare.
  Comando Aéreo de Combate No. 3 (CACOM 3) "MG. Alberto Pauwels Rodríguez"in Malambo / Barranquilla, Atlántico
 Grupo de Combate 31
 Escuadrón de Combate 311 Dragones (A-37 Dragonfly).
 Escuadrón de Combate 312 Drakos (A-29B Supertucano).
 Escuadrón de Combate Táctico 313 (AC-47T Fantasma, Bell 212 Rapaz, C-95A, SA2-37B Vampiro, UH-1 Huey II).
  Comando Aéreo de Combate No. 4 (CACOM 4) "TC. Luis Francisco Pinto Parra"in Melgar, Tolima
 Grupo de Combate 41
 Escuadrón de Combate 411 Rapaz (Bell 212).
 Escuadrón de Asalto Aéreo 412 (Bell UH-1H/P).
 Eccuadron de Ataque 413 Escorpión (MD 500/530).
 Grupo CSAR.
 Escuela de Helicópteros de las Fuerzas Armadas.
 Escuadrón de Vuelo (Bell UH-1H, Bell 206, Bell OH-58 Kiowa).
  Comando Aéreo de Combate No. 5 (CACOM 5) "GR. Arturo Lema Posada"in Rionegro, Antioquia
 Grupo de Combate 51
 Escuadrón de Combate 511 (AH-60L Arpía IV)
 Escuadrón de Operaciones Especiales 512 (Ce208-675, UH-60A/L Halcón)
  Comando Aéreo de Combate No. 6 (CACOM 6) "CT. Ernesto Esguerra Cubides"in Tres Esquinas, Caquetá
 Grupo de Combate 61
 Escuadrón de Combate 611 (AT-27 Tucano, A-29B Supertucano)
 Escuadrón de Combate Táctico 613 (AC-47T Fantasma, Bell 212 Rapaz, C212-300, SA2-37B Vampiro, UH-1H-II, Scan Eagle UAV)

Transportation and Maintenance:

  Comando Aéreo de Transporte Militar (CATAM) "BG. Camilo Daza Álvarez"in Bogotá D.C.
 Grupo de Transporte Aéreo 81
 Escuadrón de Transporte 811 (C-130B/H, C295M/100)
 Escuadron de Evacuación Médica.
 Grupo de Vuelos Especiales 82
 Escuadrón de Transporte Especial 821 (B707-323C, B737-74V, Beech 300ELINT, Beech 350, Bell 412HP, C-95A, Ce208B, Ce550, F28-3000(C), PA-42-720, PA-42T, RC690D, RC695)
  Comando Aéreo de Mantenimiento (CAMAN) "MY. Justino Mariño Cuesta"in Madrid, Cundinamarca
 Grupo de Transporte Aéreo 91
 Escuadrón de Transporte 911 (Beech C90, C212-300)

Air Groups:

  Grupo Aéreo del Caribe (GACAR) "TC. Benjamín Méndez Rey"on San Andres Island, San Andrés, Providencia y Santa Catalina
 Escuadrón de Combate 101
 Escuadrilla de Combate Táctico 1013 (Beech C90)
 Casanare Air Group (GACAS) - Grupo Aéreo de Casanare
 Embraer A-29B Super Tucano
  Grupo Aéreo del Oriente (GAORI) "CR. Luis Arturo Rodríguez Meneses"in Marandúa, Vichada
 Grupo de Combate 111
 Escuadrilla de Combate Táctico 1113 (AC-47T Fantasma, AB212 Rapaz, UH-1H, Scan Eagle UAV)

Training:

  Escuela Militar de Aviación (EMAVI) "Marco Fidel Suárez"in Santiago de Cali, Valle del Cauca
 Grupo de Educación Aeronáutica
 Escuadrón Básico
 Grupo de Combate 71
 Escuadrón de Combate Táctico 713
  Escuela de Suboficiales FAC (ESUFA) "CT. Andrés María Díaz Díaz"in Madrid, Cundinamarca
  Instituto Militar Aeronáutico (IMA) "CT. José Edmundo Sandoval"in Bogotá D.C.

Airline:

  Servicio de Aeronavegación a Territorios Nacionales (SATENA)

Personnel
As of 2010, the Air Force fields approximately 13,500 personnel, including 2,171 officers, 3,304 Non-commissioned officers, 903 student officers, 4,673 soldiers, these usually allocated to base security, Military Police etc., and 2,382 civilians, the latter usually dedicated to specialized technical or professional activities, e.g. medical, communications, etc.

Ranks & Insignias

The tables below display the rank structures and rank insignias for the Colombian Air Force personnel.

Officers

Non-Commissioned Officers and Airmen

Aircraft

Current inventory

Former aircraft
Previous aircraft operated by the Air Force consisted of the Gavilán G358, OV-10A Bronco, IAI Arava.

Aircraft identification 

The aircraft used by the Colombian Air Force are identified with the letters "FAC" followed by three or four numbers that are painted on the tail, nose and nose landing gear doors. The serial numbers are assigned according to the aircraft's primary role as follows:

 001 Avión Presidencial
 002 to 100 trainer
 101 to 200 liaison
 201 to 300 helicopter
 301 to 500 miscellaneous
 501 to 600 light transport
 601 to 700 transport
 701 to 800 advanced trainer
 801 to 900 fighter-bomber
 901 to 1000 crew-trainer
 1001 to 1300 transport
 2001 to 2300 Close support
 2501 to 2600 bomber
 3001 to 3100 Fighter
 3101 to 3200 COIN
 4001 to 4600 helicopter
 5001 to 5600 liaison
 5701 to 5800 recon/ELINT

See also
 List of airports in Colombia
 Agrupación de Comandos Especiales Aéreos

Notes

References

External links 

 Air Force Bases in Colombia at GlobalSecurity.org
  Fuerza Aérea Colombiana
  Colombia: Seguridad & Defensa, Unofficial site
  Aviacol.net: History of the Colombian Air Force

 
Military of Colombia